The Canada–Australia Consular Services Sharing Agreement is a bilateral agreement between the governments of Australia and Canada for each country to provide consular assistance to citizens of the other in situations which are from time to time agreed between the two countries. Missions in areas where only one country has developed diplomatic relations will provide consular services to both Canadian and Australian passport holders or citizens.

This agreement has been in place since 7 August 1986 when the Right Honourable Joe Clark, P.C., M.P.,
Secretary of State for External Affairs of Canada and the Honourable Bill Hayden, M.P., Minister for Foreign Affairs of Australia exchanged notes to create the agreement.  The agreement was renewed in 2001, with 14 Canadian posts (mostly in West African and the Latin American countries) and 13 Australian delegations (mainly in the South Pacific) where consular services are shared were specified.

Background
Australia and Canada share many similarities in the countries’ histories, composition of populations and culture.  Both countries were formed from the union of British colonies and both have absorbed large number of British immigrants in previous centuries.. Apart from the similar history, both countries are also famous for their multiculturality and open attitude towards immigrants.

Canada and Australia have developed a close and deep relationship with each other and cooperate with each other in many different areas.  Both countries are members of United Nations, Asia-Pacific Economic Cooperation (APEC), Cairns Group, Commonwealth of Nations, Five Eyes and the Organisation for Economic Co-operation and Development (OECD). Being members of many worldwide organisations shows the close friendship between the government of two countries, there are multiple channels and platforms for cooperation and communication between two countries. Among many of the agreements and deals signed by two countries, the consular service sharing is the most important cooperation between two countries.

Canadian Foreign Policy
Canada has developed official relations with countries, which located in North America, South America, Europe, Asia, Africa, and Oceania. Among all other countries, the United States of America has the closest relations with Canada, two countries cooperate with each other in a wide aspect, ranging from the supply of essentials and military. What helps the flow of population between two countries is the longest border of USA and Canada which is the longest in the world, with citizens of each country can enter each other's country for short period without visa.

Australia is also a country with a close relationship with Canada. Canada developed formal relations with Australia on 12 September 1939, and the two countries have cooperated in different ways, especially in trading and mobility of populations.

Australian Foreign policy
Australia has developed formal relations with many countries across North America, South America, Europe, Africa, Asia and Oceania. Due to its unique geographical location, Australia has developed a relatively close relationships with Asian countries, interactions between Australia and other Asian countries are also more frequent than with any European and countries in North and South America. 

New Zealand is one of the closest countries to Australia geographically, which promotes the extremely close connections between two countries. To take advantage of the relationship between two countries, Australia cooperates with New Zealand in multiple ways, with the Trans-Tasman migration and connections being the most significant. This agreement was signed in 1973 and allowed the free flow of citizens between two countries, increasing the population of New Zealanders in major cities of Australia including Sydney, Melbourne, and Brisbane.

Consulate

The Vienna Convention on Consular Relations provides the broad, detailed and internationally accepted definition of consular functions, which have listed out specific functions that each consular must provide to their citizens in foreign countries.

This treaty consists of 79 articles, which lists out the functions of consuls and specific rules for the host countries to protect the right of consuls from foreign countries. For example, the host country does not have the right to enter the site of foreign embassies without the permission from the consuls, whilst the host countries have the responsibility to protect the consular premises from danger.

Information

Australian and Canada Consular Services Sharing Agreement was the agreement signed by Australia and Canada on 7 August 1986. This agreement promises use of certain consular services of Canadian citizens and Australian citizens in some countries where only one of them have official consular.

All the arrangement of the services are assigned according to the Memorandum of Understandings between the Department of Foreign affairs, Trade and Development of Canada (DFATD) and the Department of Foreign Affairs and Trade of Australia (DFAT).

Consular guides and instructions
 
The following information are provided based on details in the Canada-Australia Consular Service Sharing Agreement.

All consular services mentioned will be provided in accordance with country specific rules. For services provided by Canadian consuls, they need to follow the rules in the Manual of Consular Instructions; if services are provided by Australian consuls, all procedures must follow the rules according to the Australian Consular Instructions and the Manual of Australian Passport Issue.

The Australian Department of Foreign Affairs and Trade will provide certain consular services in English and French, since Canada has two official language which are English and French, the Department of Foreign Affairs Canada will afford the cost of providing services in English and French by the Australian Department of Foreign Affairs and Trade. If the Australian mission are not able to provide services to a Canadian in French, officers of the Australian mission will assist the interaction of the Canadian with the Canadian supervising mission by phone or any electronic communications facilities.

For request involving the request of emergency travel documents, they will be directed to the corresponding missions. The responsible mission will issue their specific “Emergency Passports” to their citizens which will only in effect for limited time for the purpose of allowing them to return to their home countries.

When under specific crisis, both departments recognise the value and importance of contingency planning and crisis management, and the opportunities presented by bilateral cooperation in this area, which means responsible missions must consider the value off both Canadian and Australian citizens in their emergency plans and the plant must be shared with their appropriate supervising mission.

Missions that will serve both Australian and Canadian citizens will their corresponding supervising missions. The responsible mission reports all re	quests from citizens that were not their responsible countries to their supervising missions, they need specific instructions and authorities from the supervising mission.

Communications between the responsible missions and supervising missions are variable. In most cases, consolations will be by phone and specific instructions and authorities will be in written form. If there are complaints about the services provided by the mission of the other country, responsible missions will refer the complaint to the home department of relevant missions for investigations.

The use or disclosure of personal information is strictly monitored by the privacy law in either Canada or Australia. Some of the requests by citizens of other countries may involve the use of personal information, the mission that possess the request or should be in accordance with Canada's Privacy Act or Australia's Privacy Act 1988.

Australia and Canada Federal government will consult in frequent period to consider whether any changes in the Memorandum of Understanding needed or not, all the operation of the Memorandum of Understanding will be reviewed annual to coincide with the Five Nations Consular Colloque, the review will be reschedules if there is no Colloque schedules.

The Memorandum of Understanding was updated in 2001, which replaced the Memorandum of Understanding on Sharing Consular Services between the Department of External Affairs of Canada and the Department of Foreign Affairs of Australia signed on 22 January 1987. The Memorandum of Understanding can be terminated by giving notice from either the Department External Affairs of Canada or the Department of Foreign Affairs of Australia, the Memorandum of Understanding will be invalid 6 months after receipt of that notice. However, termination of the updated Memorandum of Understanding will not affect the continuation in force of the original agreement of 7 August 1986.

Consular Services Included and not Included in the agreement

Services that will be provided for other nations:

Intervention in cases of arrest or detention

Intervention to assist victims of crime or accidents in foreign countries

Assistance on international child abduction/custody cases

Relieve, financial assistance and repatriation which will be provided on the recoverable basis

Assistance in cases of illness and hospitalisation, such as arrangements for payment of medical and hospital services which will also be provided in recoverable basis

Issue of emergency travel documents to Australians and Canadians

Assistance with arrangements regarding deaths of citizens, including local burial or transportation of the remains

Assistance related to lost or stolen property enquiries, local enquiries regarding the whereabouts of nationals of the other country

Assistance relating to crisis management

Local registration of nationals of the other country

Passing requests for information and services which are not included in the agreement to the supervising missions

Services that will not be shared

Issuance of regular passports or visas

Legal or notarial acts

Assistance in extradition cases

Administration of the estates of citizens

Registration of deaths

Invigilation of examinations

Provision of specific information on any matter

Australian Missions

Canadians can seek consular assistance from the following Australian diplomatic missions, they are all supervised by nearby Canadian missions:

 Pohnpei (Embassy)
 Covers Guam, Marianas Islands, Marshall Islands, and Palau.
 Supervised by mission in Canberra 

 Nouméa (Consulate-General)
 Covers French Polynesia and Wallis & Futuna
 Supervised by mission in Wellington and Canberra 

 Denpasar, Bali (Consulate-General)
 Supervised by mission in Jakarta 

 Tarawa (High Commission)
 Supervised by mission in Wellington 

 Aiwo (High Commission)
 Supervised by mission in Canberra 

 Port Moresby (High Commission)
 Supervised by mission in Canberra 

 Apia (High Commission)
 Covers American Samoa
 Supervised by mission in Wellington 

 Honiara (High Commission)
 Supervised by mission in Canberra 
 
 Phuket (Consulate-General)
 Supervised by mission in Bangkok
 
 Dili (Embassy)
 Supervised by mission in Jakarta

 Nukualofa (High Commission)
 Supervised by mission in Wellington 

 Honolulu (Consulate-General)
 Supervised by mission in San Francisco 

 Port Vila (High Commission)
 Supervised by mission in Canberra

Canadian missions

Australians can seek consular assistance from the following Canadian diplomatic missions, they are all supervised by Australian missions or embassies in nearby area:

 Algiers (Embassy)
Supervised by Australian embassy in Paris 

 Ouagadougou (Embassy)
Supervised by missions in Accra 

 Yaoundé (High Commission)
 Covers Gabon
Supervised by missions in Abuja 

 Abidjan (Embassy)
Supervised by mission in Accra 

 Havana (Embassy)
Supervised by missions in Mexico City 

 Kinshasa (Embassy)
Supervised by mission in Harare 

 Santo Domingo (Embassy)
Supervised by mission in Mexico City 

 Quito (Embassy)
Supervised by mission in Santiago de Chile 

 Yaoundé (Canadian High Commission in Cameroon provides consular assistance to Australian citizens in Gabon)
Supervised by mission in Abuja 

 Dakar (Canadian Embassy in Senegal provides consular assistance to Australian citizens in The Gambia)
Supervised by mission in Abuja 

 Dakar (Canadian Embassy in Senegal provides consular assistance to Australian citizens in Guinea)
Supervised by mission in Accra 

 Budapest (Embassy)
Supervised by mission in Vienna 

 Reykjavík (Embassy)
Supervised by mission in Copenhagen 

 Astana (Embassy)

 Bamako (Embassy)
Supervised by mission in Accra 

 Rabat (Embassy)

 Dakar (Embassy)
 Covers Guinea and The Gambia.

 Tunis (Embassy)

 Caracas (Embassy)

See also

 Australia–Canada relations
 CANZUK

References

Australia and the Commonwealth of Nations
Canada and the Commonwealth of Nations
Australia–Canada relations
1986 in international relations
1986 in Australia
1986 in Canada